Nickel(II) nitrite is an inorganic compound with the chemical formula Ni(NO2)2. Anhydrous nickel nitrite was first discovered in 1961 by Cyril Clifford Addison, who allowed gaseous nickel tetracarbonyl to react with dinitrogen tetroxide, yielding a green smoke. Nickel nitrite was the second transition element anhydrous nitrite discovered after silver nitrite.

Properties 
Nickel nitrite decomposes when heated to 220°C, however it can be heated up to 260°C in argon. The nitrite is covalently bonded to nickel, and the material is slightly volatile. The infrared spectrum of the solid has absorption bands at 1575, 1388, 1333, 1240, 1080, and 830 cm−1. Liquid dinitrogen tetroxide oxidises nickel nitrite to nickel nitrate.

In solution

The aqueous complex Ni(NO2)2(H2O)4 forms when an alkali metal nitrite is added to a nickel salt solution: 

 + 2   Ni(NO2)2(H2O)4 + 2 H2O; K = 0.16 at standard conditions

The complex is a much more intense emerald green colour than the Ni(H2O)62+ ion. Brooker claims that intense light photocatalyses the destruction of the ionic nitro complexes, leaving only Ni(NO2)2(H2O)4.

Nickel nitrite slowly decomposes slightly in aqueous solution due to disproportionation:

3 NO2− + 2 H+ → 2 NO(g) + NO3– + H2O

Complexes

Nickel nitrite can also form complexes with other ligands. In some of these, the nitro groups are altered in their attachment to nickel (linkage isomerism), so that instead of linking via a nitrogen atom, they link via an oxygen atom, forming "nitrito-" complexes. The change to nitrito happens due to steric hindrance from the other ligands. These complexes can be stable as solids.  

Members include the blue Ni(pyridine)4(ONO)2, blue green Ni(substituted ethylene diamines)2(ONO)2, blue Ni(N,N-diethylethylenediamine)2(NO2)2, blue-green Ni(N,N'-diethylethylenediamine)2(NO2)2, red Ni(NO2)2(NH3)4, red Ni(ethylenediamine)2(NO2)2, red Ni(N-monosubstituted-ethylenediamine)2(NO2)2, red Ni(1,2-diamino-2-methylpropane)2(NO2)2, pink Ni(N-methylethylenediamine)2(NO2)2, red Ni(N-ethylethylenediamine)2(NO2)2, and red Ni(rac-diphenylethylenediamine)2(NO2)2. In a chloroform solution, some of these nitro- complexes partially isomerize into nitito- complexes. 

Yet more complexed nickel nitrites include red Ni(2-(aminomethyl)piperidine)2(NO2)2, reddish blue-violet Ni(2-(aminomethyl)pyridine)2(NO2)2, violet Ni(2-(methylaminomethyl)pyridine)2(ONO)2, blue Ni(2-(methylaminomethyl)piperidine)2(ONO)2, blue Ni(2-(aminomethyl)-6-methylpyridine)2(ONO)2, blue-grey Ni(2-(aminomethyl)-6-methylpiperidine)2(ONO)2, red Ni(N,N'-dimethylethylenediamine)2(NO2)2•H2O, Ni(N,N-dimethylethylenediamine)2(NO2)2, green Ni(α-picoline)2(NO2)2, and green Ni(quinoline)2(NO2)2,

Double salts
The nitronickelates are related compounds where more nitro groups are attached to nickel to yield an anion.  They could be described as nickel double nitrites.

References

Nickel compounds
Nitrites
Substances discovered in the 1960s